Isopogon villosus is a species of flowering plant in the family Proteaceae and is endemic to southwestern Western Australia. It is a tufted shrub with cylindrical leaves with twenty-five to thirty-two widely diverging lobes, and oval heads of cream-coloured to yellow flowers.

Description
Flowering occurs from September to November and the fruit is a hairy nut, fused with others in an oval head  in diameter.

Taxonomy
Isopogon villosus was first formally described in 1856 by Carl Meissner in de Candolle's Prodromus Systematis Naturalis Regni Vegetabilis. (Meissner had previously published the name Isopogon villosus in 1852 but without a description.)

Distribution and habitat
This isopogon grows in heath and shrubland in scattered populations between Pingelly and Lake King in the Avon Wheatbelt, Esperance Plains and Mallee biogeographic regions.

Conservation status
Isopogon villosus is classified as "not threatened" by the Western Australian Government Department of Parks and Wildlife.

References

villosus
Eudicots of Western Australia
Plants described in 1856
Taxa named by Carl Meissner